QualNet is a testing and simulation tool owned and provided by Scalable Network Technologies, Inc. As network simulation software, it acts as a planning, testing, and training tool which mimics the behavior of a physical communications network.

See also
Network simulation

Wireless networking
Computer network analysis
Computer networking
Simulation software